Bhopal Lok Sabha constituency is one of the 29 Lok Sabha constituencies in Madhya Pradesh state in central India. This constituency presently covers the entire Bhopal district and part of Sehore district.

Assembly Segments
Like most other Lok Sabha seats in MP and Chhattisgarh, with few seats like Durg (which has nine assembly segments under it) being exceptions, Bhopal Lok Sabha seat has 8 assembly seats as its segments.

Members of Parliament

Election results

2019 results

2014 results

2009 results

2004 results

1999 results

1998 results

1996 results

1991 results

1989 results

1984 results

See also
 Bhopal district
 List of Constituencies of the Lok Sabha

References

External links
Bhopal lok sabha  constituency election 2019 result details

Bhopal district
Lok Sabha constituencies in Madhya Pradesh
Bhopal
Year of establishment missing